Goshen High School may refer to:
Goshen High School (Alabama), in Goshen, Alabama
Goshen High School (Indiana), in Goshen, Indiana
Goshen High School (Ohio), in Goshen, Ohio
Goshen Central High School, in Goshen, New York